Cornelius O'Brien (1782–1857) was an Irish politician, Member of Parliament and landowner in County Clare.

He was the son of Henry O'Brien from Ennis and his wife Helen (née O'Callaghan). Born at the O'Brien residence at Birchfield House in Beaghy townland of Kilmacrehy parish, now demolished and replaced by a farm house. It was a house designed in the exotic "Moorish" or "Foreign Legion" style.

Cornelius O'Brien was married firstly in 1816 to Margaret, the daughter of Peter Long of Waterford. She was the widow of James O'Brien of Limerick. His second wife was Ellen McLaughlin daughter of Hugh McLaughlin, merchant of Ennis. They married in July 1836 in Limerick. Cornelius was a solicitor (from 1811) and later also magistrate for Clare.

Cornelius (or Corney) became MP for Clare in 1832. He was a Liberal in favour of Repeal of the Union and was reelected (with a break from 1847 to 1852) until his death in 1857.

His other residences besides Birchfield were at 4 North Street, Westminster, London and 20 Summerhill, Dublin.

He built a tower, now referred to as O'Brien's Tower on the Cliffs of Moher in 1835 as an observation tower for the hundreds of tourists that frequented the cliffs during the time.

Folklore holds that Cornelius O'Brien was a man ahead of his time, believing that the development of tourism would benefit the local economy and bring people out of poverty. O'Brien also built St. Brigid's National School (1846) and a wall of Moher flagstones along the Cliffs. It is said in the locality that he "built everything around here except the Cliffs". He died in 1857 and his remains lie in the O'Brien vault in the graveyard adjoining Liscannor's St Brigid's Well.

The O'Brien Monument, a Doric column topped by an urn, was built during his lifetime, paid for by compulsory subscriptions of his tenants.

References

External links 
 
 Cornelius O'Brien of Birchfield (1782-1857)

1782 births
1857 deaths
Politicians from County Clare
Members of the Parliament of the United Kingdom for County Clare constituencies (1801–1922)
UK MPs 1832–1835
UK MPs 1835–1837
UK MPs 1837–1841
UK MPs 1841–1847
UK MPs 1852–1857
Cornelius
People from Ennis
19th-century Irish landowners
Irish landlords